The 1906 Western State Normal Hilltoppers football team represented Western State Normal School (later renamed Western Michigan University) as an independent during the 1906 college football season.  In their first season under head coach Tubby Meyers, the Hilltoppers compiled a 1–2 record and were outscored by their opponents, 28 to 26. In addition to serving as the head coach, halfback Tubby Meyers was the team captain for the first of three consecutive years.

The team's first game was a 21–0 victory over Wayland High School from Wayland, Michigan, on October 13, 1906.

The school's first intercollegiate football game was a 14–0 loss to Kalamazoo College on November 3, 1906. Two weeks later, the team lost, 14–5, to Michigan State Normal.

On November 12, 1906, the team, the first for the school, was honored at an oyster dinner hosted by the manual training department with 15 women, all students from the domestic science department, as hostesses. Brown and gold pennants were presented to each guest, and a miniature brown and gold football was placed on every plate.

Schedule

References

Western State Normal
Western Michigan Broncos football seasons
Western State Normal Hilltoppers football